This is a list of States and union territories of India ranked according to unemployment rate. The list is compiled from the Report on Periodic Labour Force Survey (2018–19) released by Ministry of Statistics and Programme Implementation, Government of India.

Chhattisgarh has the least unemployment rate among the Indian states, while Rajasthan has the highest unemployment rate. (Higher rank represents higher unemployment among the population). The national average stands at 6.4 percent.

Unemployment rate by States and Union territory (CMIE Data)

Unemployment rate every month

See also
 Unemployment in India
 Unemployment in Kerala

References

Unemployment rate
Lists of subdivisions of India
Employment in India
Unemployment
India, unemployment rate